Charles Blakeney may refer to:
 Charles Blakeney (Canadian politician) (1888–1961), newspaper owner and political figure in New Brunswick, Canada
 Charles Blakeney (Australian politician) (1802–1876), judge and politician in Queensland, Australia